Welcome to Medina is the international debut studio album by Danish-Chilean electropop singer Medina. It was released on 23 July 2010 in Germany, Switzerland and Austria and 26 July 2010 in Denmark The album was preceded by the release of the lead single, "You and I", on 3 May 2010.

Welcome to Medina is the international edition of her second Danish studio album, Velkommen til Medina (2009). The album's four hit singles, "Kun for mig", "Velkommen til Medina", "Ensom" and "Vi to" have been translated into "You & I", "Welcome to Medina", "Lonely" and "The One", while the rest are new songs recorded for the international market. The album was re-released on 26 November 2010 with a new song entitled "Sundown", and a second disc containing music videos and remixes. A further version of the album was rereleased on 11 November 2011 as "Welcome to Medina (Ultimate Collection)". The release contains all the tracks from the standard and special edition, additional remixes and the two new Danish singles "For Altid" and "Synd For Dig".

Chart performance
In Germany, Welcome To Medina entered the German Albums Chart at number ten. In its second week, the album rose to number nine, achieving a new peak position.

The album also charted in Austria and Switzerland peaking at number 45 and 24, respectively.

Singles
"You and I" was released as the album's lead single on 21 September 2009 in the UK, where it peaked at number 39, and on 3 May 2010 in Germany, Austria and Switzerland, peaking at number 10, 25 and 30, respectively.

"Lonely" was released as the album's second single on 3 September 2010 in Germany and Austria, where it peaked at number 26 and 46, respectively.

"Addiction" is the third single of the album, released on 26 November 2010 in Germany. The song reached number 1 on the Danish Singles Chart.

"Gutter" was released as the album's fourth single on 18 March 2011 in Germany and peaked at number 43 on the German Singles Chart and at number 8 on the Danish Singles Chart.

"The One" was released as the fifth single from the album on 12 August 2011. The music video for the song premiered on 27 July 2011, and is similar to the Danish version entitled "Vi to", but with some new scenes with Medina singing in different parts. The single peaked at number 64 on the German Singles Chart.

"Execute Me" was released as the sixth and final single from the album on 11 November 2011 in Germany and Austria. The release contains the album version, two remixes and the music video, which premiered on 24 October 2011

Promotional singles
"Selfish" was released digitally in Germany on 15 October 2010 as a promotional single.

Track listing

Special Edition

Ultimate Collection

Personnel
Providers – production, mixing, mastering
Rasmus Stabell – executive producer, instruments
Jeppe Federspiel – executive producer, instruments
Thomas Børresen – executive producer
Medina Valbak – vocals
Anders Schumann – mixing, mastering

Source:

Charts and certifications

Charts

Certifications

Release history

References

2010 debut albums
Medina (singer) albums